Edison Elementary School is the name of a K–8 grade school in the town of Edison, Washington, United States. Its mascot is the Wildcat.

History 
The original building was built in 1914 and was used for Edison High School, but by the late 1940s, Edison had partnered with nearby Burlington to create the Burlington-Edison School District, including a new high school, Burlington-Edison High School. In 1996, the district tore down the original building and constructed a new building for Edison Elementary.

References 

Public elementary schools in Washington (state)
Education in Skagit County, Washington
Buildings and structures in Skagit County, Washington
Public middle schools in Washington (state)